The 2013–14 season was the 109th season of competitive association football played by 1. Fußball- und Sportverein Mainz 05, a professional football club based in Mainz, Rhineland-Palatinate, England. The club's 13th-placed finish in 2012–13 meant the club would again compete in the Bundesliga, alongside the DFB-Pokal. The 2013–14 season ran from 1 July 2013 to 30 June 2014.

Season summary
The club finished 7th in the Bundesliga, securing qualification for the following season's UEFA Europa League qualification rounds. Manager Thomas Tuchel left the club at the end of the season.

Competitions

2. Bundesliga

League table

Results summary

Results by matchday

Matches

DFB-Pokal

Player statistics

Appearances and goals

References

1. FSV Mainz 05 seasons
Mainz season 2013-14